IP over DWDM (IPoDWDM) is a technology used in telecommunications networks to integrate IP routers and network switches in the OTN (Optical Transport Network).
A true IPoDWDM solution is implemented only when the IP Routers and Switches support ITU-T G.709. In this way IP devices can monitor the optical path and implement the transport functionality as FEC (Forward Error Correction) specified by ITU-T G.709/Y.1331 or Super FEC functionality defined in ITU-T G.975.1.

Benefits 
This approach saves network components including shelves, processors, interfaces cards and hence it permits to reduce the power consumption, OPEX (Operational expenditure) and CAPEX (capital expenditure).
This approach brings also a simplification of the network, eliminating the SDH/SONET intermediate layer.

Multivendors
A DWDM network can be implemented using different vendor technology from the IP devices as long as they support alien wavelength transmission specified by ITU-T G.698.2.

References

External links 
 (ITU-T | Kaleidoscope event 2009 | conference)

Telecommunications engineering
Network architecture
Telecommunications infrastructure
Fiber-optic communications